"Good Form" is a song by Trinidadian-born rapper and singer Nicki Minaj. The original mix debuted on the US Billboard Bubbling Under Hot 100 singles chart at number nine following the release of her fourth studio album, Queen, on August 10, 2018. A remix to the song featuring American rapper Lil Wayne was released on November 29, 2018, as the fourth single from the album, where it peaked at number 60 on the Billboard Hot 100. It was written by Minaj and was produced by Mike Will Made It and Plush.

Background 
"Good Form" originally appeared on March 29, 2018 in a Mercedes-Benz commercial starring Minaj. Instrumentals from the song could be heard at one point during the advertisement. The song was included as a track on Minaj's album Queen, released on August 10, 2018.

Music video

A music video for the remix song was released on November 29, 2018 coincident with the song. Directed by Colin Tilley, it stars Minaj and Wayne along with reality star Evelyn Lozada, actress Lauren London, the Clermont twins, and rappers Tyga, Gudda Gudda, and Marley G. Charles Holmes of Rolling Stone described the video as "a full-length monument to twerking, and a sensual overload", as well as "an Oscar contender of a music video".

Reception
Briana Younger of Pitchfork commented about the song: "the twerk-ready 'Good Form' showcase the rapper’s inimitable technique... Little tricks, like her play on the phonetics of 'good form,' which she alternates to sound like 'good for him,' are the kind of flourishes that set her apart", Maeve McDermott from USA Today was positive towards the song; she stated, "[the song] is peak Nicki bravado – chest puffing and explicit – and a fitting counterpart to 'LLC,' as a pair of tracks with the stinging lyricism and bratty flows at which Minaj excels." Israel Daramola of Spin listed the song as being a standout track from the album. In HipHopDX, Trent Clark called it a "fraternal filler."

Live performances

Minaj performed the song live on November 4, 2018 in a medley, which featured "Woman Like Me" by British girlband Little Mix at the 2018 MTV Europe Music Awards. She performed the single again, along with "Dip" with American rapper Tyga at the 44th People's Choice Awards. Minaj also performed the song as part of her setlist on The Nicki Wrld Tour, during her shows in London and Birmingham.

Chart performance

For the week of December 8, 2018, the remix reached number 16 on the Billboard R&B/Hip Hop Digital Song Sales chart. For the issue dated December 15, 2018, the song entered the US Billboard Hot 100 at number 60.

Credits and personnel
Credits adapted from Queen album liner notes and Tidal.

Recording
 Recorded at Germano Studios, New York City, and Criteria Studios, Miami, Florida
 Mixed at Larrabee Sound Studios, North Hollywood, California
 Mastered at Chris Athens Masters, Austin, Texas

Personnel
 Nicki Minaj – main artist
 Lil Wayne – featured artist
 Mike Will Made It – production
 Pluss – production
 Aubry "Big Juice" Delaine – record engineering
 Manny Galvez – record engineering
 Matthew Sim – record engineering assistance
 Jason Staniulis – record engineering assistance
 Kenta Yonesaka – record engineering assistance
 Nick Valentin – record engineering assistance
 Jaycen Joshua – mixing
 David Nakaji – mixing assistance
 Ben Milchev – mixing assistance
 Chris Athens – mastering

Charts
Original mix

Remix

Release history

References

2018 singles
2018 songs
Lil Wayne songs
Nicki Minaj songs
Music videos directed by Colin Tilley
Song recordings produced by Mike Will Made It
Songs written by Nicki Minaj
Songs written by Mike Will Made It
Songs written by Asheton Hogan
Trap music songs